Temperance Billiard Hall Co. Ltd. was a company founded in 1906 in Pendleton, Lancashire, as part of the wider temperance movement, which built billiard halls in the north of England and London.

Several of the former halls are now Grade II listed buildings, such as the 1910 Temperance Billiard Hall, Fulham, London, now somewhat ironically a pub called The Temperance.

The Temperance Billiard Hall built in Chorlton-cum-Hardy, Manchester, in 1907, also Grade II listed, is now a J D Wetherspoon pub called the Sedge Lynn.

Their first in-house architect was Norman Evans, who designed a dozen and a half halls from 1906 to 1911, including both of the halls mentioned above.

Thomas Retford Somerford (sometimes noted mistakenly as T. G. Somerford) was their second architect. His 1912-1914 hall at 134-141 King's Road, Chelsea, London is now a Grade II listed building. Somerford's hall at 411-417 Coldharbour Lane, Brixton, London is also still there, but the frontage has been sub-divided into a number of smaller shop units, and the upper storeys are used as a hotel.

Locations (July 1958)

London 

Acton: 27 King Street
Battersea: 66 Battersea Rise (illustrated)

Chelsea: 131 King's Road (illustrated)
Clapham: 47 Clapham High Street (illustrated)
Croydon: 16 Katherine Street
Ealing: 34/42 Bond Street
Fulham: 90 High St
Hammersmith: 150 King Street
Highbury: 12 Highbury Corner
Hounslow: 1 High Street
Ilford: 257 High Road

Kingston: 17/19 Fife Road
Lavender Hill: 638/640 Wandsworth Road
Lewisham: 237 High Street
Morden: 36 Aberconway Road
Putney: 118 High Street
Richmond: 6 Red Lion Street
Streatham: 42 Streatham High Road
Tooting Bec: 2a Lynwood Road
Twickenham: 1 Richmond Road
Victoria: 104/112 Buckingham Palace Road
Walthamstow: Hoe Street, E17 (also known as the Queen's)
Wimbledon: 111 The Broadway
Wood Green: 1/3 High Road

Sussex 
Worthing: 12 Bath Place

Greater Manchester 
Eccles: Liverpool Road
Oldham: Union Street
Rochdale: Nelson Street
Urmston: Station Road

Manchester
Cheetham Hill: Cheetham Hill Road
Chorlton: Manchester Road
Gorton: Hyde Road
Harpurhey: Rochdale Road
Moss Side: Moss Lane East
Rusholme: Wilmslow Road

References

Temperance movement
1906 establishments in the United Kingdom
Cue sports in the United Kingdom